is a Japanese manga series written and illustrated by Suu Morishita. It started serialization in Kodansha's Dessert magazine in July 2019. As of February 2023, eight tankōbon volumes have been released.

Development
In an interview with Kodansha USA, the author duo Suu Morishita stated that they decided to make the main theme sign language since they were both interested in the idea. However, since neither of them had much experience with sign language, they did research, which included reading books on the subject, interviewing teachers, and getting someone to supervise how it was used.

When it came to the art, they decided to use Copic Multiliner brown markers for the outlines and Dr. Ph. Martin's color ink for the coloring because they felt it gave the art a "soft and delicate" style.

Media

Manga
The series is written and illustrated by the author duo Suu Morishita. It started serialization in Dessert on July 24, 2019. On June 24, 2021, it was announced the manga would go on a hiatus as the writer and storyboarder gave birth to a child. The manga returned in November 2021. As of February 2023, eight tankōbon volumes have been released.

In March 2020, Kodansha USA announced they licensed the manga for English publication digitally. At Anime Expo Lite in July 2020, they announced a print release for the series. Later that month, they announced they would publish chapters of the series digitally simultaneously with the Japanese release. The series was also translated into French by Rosalys and published by Akata.

Volume list

Musical
A musical adaption ran in the Honda Theater in Tokyo from June 4 to June 13, 2021. It was directed by Maiko Tanaka, with Sanae Iijima writing the screenplay, Kiyoko Ogino composing the music, and Kiyomi Maeda in charge of choreography. It starred Erika Toyohara as Yuki, Takahisa Maeyama as Itsuomi, Manatsu Hayashi as Rin, Saho Aono as Ema, Ikeoka Ryōsuke as Ōshi, Kodai Miyagi as Shin, and Ryuji Kamiyama as Kyōya.

Reception
The series ranked 17th in the 2020 Next Manga Award. It ranked ninth in the 2021 edition of the Kono Manga ga Sugoi! guidebook's top 20 Manga for female readers. Also that year the series was nominated for the Kodansha Manga Award in the shōjo category. It was also nominated for the same award in 2022. The manga was also nominated for the first Ebook Japan manga award. The manga also won the grand prize at the eleventh An An manga award. The manga has been nominated for the 68th Shogakukan Manga Award in the shōjo category.

Sean Gaffney from Manga Bookshelf gave the first volume praise, calling it an "excellent debut" and stating he wanted to read more. Koiwai from Manga News also praised it. Like Gaffney and Koiwai, Darkstorm from Anime UK News also gave the first volume praise, comparing it to A Silent Voice, as well as calling it "beautifully drawn and written".

See also
Like a Butterfly — Another manga series by the same author.

References

External links
 
 
 

Drama anime and manga
Kodansha manga
Literature about deaf people
Romance anime and manga
Shōjo manga
Works published under a pseudonym